The New Brigham Hotel is a historic three-story hotel building in Ogden, Utah. It was built with red bricks in 1913 by the J.K. Eckert Construction Company, and designed in the Chicago School architectural style. It has been listed on the National Register of Historic Places since June 14, 1979.

It has also been known as The Toone Hotel.

References

	
National Register of Historic Places in Weber County, Utah
Chicago school architecture in the United States
Hotel buildings completed in 1913
1913 establishments in Utah